Fakhr al-Din al-Akhlati (Kurdish: Fexredînê Exlatî, Fakhr al-Din al-Kurdi al-Akhlati; ; flourished ), was a Kurdish and Islamic astronomer from Anatolia, who worked at the Maragha observatory. He was one of the first elites that the Persian polymath Nasir al-Din al-Tusi recruited to work in there. Al-Akhlati's life was in a period contemporaneous with the fall of Baghdad at the hands of the Mongols in 1258.

References

Sources

Further reading
 

Astronomers of the medieval Islamic world
10th-century people from the Abbasid Caliphate